Brunner is a lunar impact crater that is located along the  eastern limb of the Moon, to the southeast of the Mare Smythii. At this location the crater is viewed from the edge, and so it is not possible to see much detail from the Earth. The visibility of this formation is also affected by libration. The crater lies to the southwest of the walled plain Hirayama, and to the east of the elongated crater Houtermans.

The rim of Brunner is well-defined and nearly circular, although there  is a slight outward bulge and a depressed wall along the north. The interior of the crater is rugged and irregular, with a central ridge formation at the midpoint. There is also a ring-like formation on the floor that is concentric with the inner wall.

Satellite craters
By convention these features are identified on lunar maps by placing the letter on the side of the crater midpoint that is closest to Brunner.

References

External links

 LTO-82D1 Brunner — L&PI topographic map

Impact craters on the Moon